Bidar Lok Sabha constituency is one of the 28 Lok Sabha (parliamentary) constituencies in Karnataka state in India. This constituency came into existence in 1962. It was reserved for the candidates belonging to the Scheduled castes till 2008. It comprises the entire Bidar district and part of Kalaburagi district.

List of Vidhan Sabha segments
Bidar Lok Sabha constituency presently comprises the following eight Legislative Assembly segments:

Members of Lok Sabha

Election results

2019 Elections

2014 Elections

2004 Lok Sabha Elections
 Ramchandra Veerappa (BJP) : 312,838 votes (Died in 2004)    
 Narsingrao Hulla Suryawanshi (INC) : 289,217

2004 bye-election
 Narsing Halla Suryawanshi (INC) : 196,917 votes
 Basawraj Ramchandra Veerappa (BJP) : 183,447  (Son of Ramchandra Veerappa)

1962 Elections
 Ramachander Veerappa (INC) 95,691 votes 
 B. Shamsunder (PSP)  41,389 votes

References

Lok Sabha constituencies in Karnataka
Bidar district